Halifax County is the name of three counties:
In Canada:
Halifax County, Nova Scotia
In the United States:
Halifax County, North Carolina
Halifax County, Virginia